The 1985 FIBA European Championship for Cadettes was the 6th edition of the European basketball championship for U16 women's teams, today known as FIBA U16 Women's European Championship. 12 teams featured in the competition, held in Tuzla, then Yugoslavia, from 20 to 27 July 1985.

The Soviet Union won their sixth title in a row.

Participating teams

Preliminary round
In the Preliminary Round, the twelve teams were allocated in two groups of six teams each. The top two teams of each group advanced to the semifinals. The third and fourth place of each group qualified for the 5th-8th playoffs. The last two teams of each group qualified for the 9th-12th playoffs.

Group A

Group B

Playoffs

9th-12th playoff

5th-8th playoff

Championship playoff

Final standings

External links
Official Site

FIBA U16 Women's European Championship
1985–86 in European women's basketball
1985–86 in Yugoslav basketball
International youth basketball competitions hosted by Yugoslavia
International women's basketball competitions hosted by Yugoslavia
International youth basketball competitions hosted by Bosnia and Herzegovina